Daniel Kane is an American retired ice hockey center who was an All-American for Bowling Green and helped the team win its first National Championship in 1984.

Career
Kane arrived in Bowling Green in the fall of 1981, just in time to see the Falcons regain their status as one of the CCHA's top teams. As a freshman he helped BGSU finish atop the conference standings, third in the CCHA Tournament and reach the NCAA Tournament. The team's season was ended when they lost a heart-breaking triple overtime match to New Hampshire in the quarterfinals.

In his sophomore season, Kane began to come into his own, more than doubling his goal production as the team finished 1st in the CCHA again. Unfortunately, despite a runner-up finish in their conference tournament, the Falcons were passed over for the 1983 NCAA Tournament despite having gone 28–8–4 during the season. The following year Bowling Green left little doubt that they were one of the best teams in the country, finishing the regular season atop their conference for the third consecutive season and posted a 17-game winning streak. Kane was the team's leading scorer and named an All-American for his efforts. The Falcons nearly suffered a tragic end when they lost three consecutive games in the CCHA Tournament, but their record was too impressive to overlook and they received an at-large bid to the National Tournament.

After overcoming a 3-goal deficit in the quarterfinal round, Bowling Green shut down perennial power Michigan State in the national semifinal to make their first Championship game appearance. In one of the most memorable games in college hockey history, Kane assisted on the quadruple-overtime game winner, ending the longest championship game in history (as of 2021). 

Both Kane and teammate Gino Cavallini capitalized on their instant fame and signed professional contracts with the Calgary Flames, forgoing their final seasons of eligibility. They went through training camp in the fall of 1984 under the legendary Bob Johnson but were assigned to the minor league Moncton Golden Flames to start. Kane played a normal rotation in his first dozen games but, when his scoring didn't materialize, he saw his ice time reduced to just a few shifts per game. Kane was eventually sent to the Milwaukee Admirals and, while he did see his production jump significantly, he retired after the season.

Kane eventually went to work for Proforma, a printing and packing company. He was working as an executive in their Business and Sales department in 2021.

Statistics

Regular season and playoffs

Awards and honors

References

External links

1962 births
Living people
Ice hockey players from New York (state)
People from Clinton County, New York
American men's ice hockey centers
Bowling Green Falcons men's ice hockey players
AHCA Division I men's ice hockey All-Americans
NCAA men's ice hockey national champions
Moncton Golden Flames players
Milwaukee Admirals players